Dinnington and Laughton railway station was situated on the South Yorkshire Joint Railway line between the town of Dinnington and village of Laughton-en-le-Morthen, near Rotherham, South Yorkshire, England.

The station was opened in December 1910 and it was served by a Doncaster - Shireoaks passenger service provided jointly by the Great Central Railway (GCR) and the Great Northern Railway (GNR). The GNR left this arrangement after just one year and the GCR carried on, extending the service to Worksop in 1920. The service closed between April 1926 and April 1927 and finally in 1929.

The station buildings, a wooden booking office / waiting room and lamp room on the Worksop bound platform and brick built structures opposite lasted until the mid - 1960s before demolition. The signal box, named Dinnington Station and situated at the south end of the Doncaster bound platform, was abolished in 1973.

The line is still open to freight trains, most frequently for coal trains between the East Coast ports and Cottam and West Burton power stations.

References 

"Railways of the South Yorkshire Coalfield from 1880", A.L.Barnett, RCTS.
"Railway Memories No.21 : Rotherham, Mexborough and Wath", A.Booth & S.Chapman, Beecode Books, 2009. 
 "Forward" the journal of the Great Central Railway Society. Various articles in numbers 82 to 89 covering the GCR Joint Lines  ISSN 0141-4488

External links
 Dinnington and Laughton station on navigable 1955 O. S. map

Disused railway stations in Rotherham
Former South Yorkshire Joint Railway stations
Railway stations in Great Britain opened in 1910
Railway stations in Great Britain closed in 1926
Railway stations in Great Britain opened in 1927
Railway stations in Great Britain closed in 1929
Dinnington, South Yorkshire
Thurcroft